Shane Nigam is an Indian actor who appears in Malayalam films. Having made his debut with the 2013 road film Neelakasham Pachakadal Chuvanna Bhoomi (2013), he went to receive wider attention for his performances in various  successful drama films Kismath (2016), Parava (2017),  Kumbalangi Nights (2019) and Ishq (2019).

Early life
Shane was born as eldest among three children, to actor Abi and Sunila, at Elamakkara, Kochi, Kerala. He did his schooling from Bhavans Vidya Mandir, Elamakkara. He was pursuing engineering at Rajagiri School of Engineering & Technology, Kochi. He has two younger sisters, Ahana and Aleena. Shane's father Abi was an actor and popular mimicry artist.

Career

Film career
Nigam made his acting debut with the film Annayum Rasoolum, portraying the role of Anna's (Andrea Jeremiah) brother. Later Rajeev Ravi offered him the lead role in Njan Steve Lopez but didn't take up the role.

He made his debut as a lead actor in 2016 film, Kismath opposite to Shruthy Menon. Producer of the film Rajeev Ravi offered him the lead role, his character won praise among the Malayali audience and the movie was a commercial success.

Nigam played a central character alongside veteran actors Amala and Manju Warrier in the 2017 film C/O Saira Banu. The following year, he appeared in the romantic film Eeda which was also praised by critics.

Nigam starred in two films in 2019; the comedy-drama Kumbalangi Nights, which was highly successful on box office and received rave reviews from film critics and the romantic thriller Ishq, which opened to a lukewarm response to audiences and critics alike.

Controversies
By the end of 2019, Shane received a death threat from Malayalam film producer Joby George, which the actor shared through Facebook live, causing controversy. The issue seemed to have been resolved through mediation from AMMA. However, he affected the continuity of the movie Veyil, by getting a haircut, leading to producers calling for a ban on the actor.

Filmography

Television

Awards

References

External links 

 

Male actors from Kerala
Living people
Male actors in Malayalam cinema
Indian male film actors
21st-century Indian male actors
Male actors in Malayalam television
Indian male television actors
21st-century Indian male child actors
South Indian International Movie Awards winners
1995 births